John Hugh Bainbridge  (31 May 1845 – 10 August 1901) was an Irish first-class cricketer and Royal Navy officer.

The son of John Hugh Bainbridge, he was born at Mallow, County Cork near Cork. He entered into service with the Royal Navy in 1859, seeing action in the final year of the Second Opium War. He gained the rank of sub-lieutenant in 1864, before being promoted to lieutenant in June 1866. Bainbridge served on HMY Victoria and Albert in the 1870s, gaining promotion to commander while aboard in August 1876. He made a single appearance in first-class cricket when he played for the Marylebone Cricket Club (MCC) against Hampshire at Southampton in 1882. He was dismissed without scoring by Charles Young in both MCC innings'. 

In June 1885, he was promoted to captain. He commanded the cruiser  in the 1890 annual manoeuvres. Bainbridge was appointed aide-de-camp to Queen Victoria in March 1897, replacing the promoted Arthur Dalrymple Fanshawe. He was promoted to rear admiral on 11 July 1899, vice John Fullerton. Bainbridge owned the steam ship SS Matador and purchased the yacht Vanadis in April 1901 from the 10th Earl of Wemyss. While sailing aboard Vanadis into Bergen on 9 August 1901, Bainbridge fell ill with apoplexy. He died at 5am the next morning. Besides his naval career, he had also served as a justice of the peace for County Cork.

References

External links

1845 births
1901 deaths
Sportspeople from Cork (city)
Royal Navy rear admirals
Royal Navy personnel of the Second Opium War
Irish cricketers
Marylebone Cricket Club cricketers
Irish justices of the peace
Deaths from bleeding